Hypsoblennius jenkinsi, commonly known as the mussel blenny, is a species of combtooth blenny found in the eastern-central Pacific Ocean.  This species grows to a length of  TL. The specific name honours Oliver Peebles Jenkins (1850-1935), who was professor of physiology at Stanford University.

References

jenkinsi
Fish described in 1896
Taxa named by David Starr Jordan